Endla may refer to: 
in Estonia
Endla Theatre, theatre in Pärnu
Endla, Jõgeva County, village in Jõgeva Parish, Jõgeva County
Lake Endla, lake in Kärde village, Jõgeva Parish, Jõgeva County
Endla, Saare County, village in Kaarma Parish, Saare County
in India
Endla, Rajasthan